Matosavank is 13th-century small Armenian monastery, hidden in a forested area of Dilijan National Park 3 km northwest from the town of Dilijan in the Tavush Province of Armenia.  It sits in close proximity to the monastery of Jukhtak Vank as well as to a nearby cemetery.  The church is currently in ruin and is relatively difficult to find since trail markers are often misleading.

Matosavank was constructed with the oversight of Avag, the son of Ivane of the Mkhargrdzeli dynasty after having vowed his submission to the Mongol invading armies.  He later became the military leader of Georgian and Armenian combined forces under Möngke Khan, the fourth Great Khan of the Mongol Empire.

Architecture 
The small church of Surb Astvatsatsin of Pghndzahank was built in 1247 and actually consists of two adjoining churches.  It was constructed from roughly hewn stones that have been overlaid with plaster within the interior of the building.  Rooms include a main hall, book depositories, a portico and each have vaulted ceilings that still stand mostly intact.  The western walls of the church sit adjacent to the portico, whereas the southern wall at the altar joins the book depository.  Upon the exterior of the structure there is an inscription that tells about the foundation of the church. Some of the tile roofing can still be seen.

Gallery

References

Bibliography

External links 
 Armeniapedia: Matosavank Monastery

Buildings and structures completed in 1247
Religious buildings and structures completed in 1247
Christian monasteries in Armenia
Tourist attractions in Tavush Province
Buildings and structures in Tavush Province